Cinygmula subaequalis is a species of flatheaded mayfly in the family Heptageniidae. It is found in southeastern, northern Canada, the eastern United States, and Alaska.

References

Mayflies
Articles created by Qbugbot
Insects described in 1914